Shamsabad in Tehran Province may refer to:

 Shamsabad, Tehran, Tehran County
 Shamsabad, Eslamshahr, Eslamshahr County
 Shamsabad, Fashapuyeh, Rey County
 Shamsabad, Kahrizak, Rey County
 Shamsabad, Varamin, Varamin County
 Shamsabad-e Arab, Varamin County